Fiddlehead is an American post-hardcore supergroup consisting of Patrick Flynn and Shawn Costa of Have Heart, Alex Henery of Basement and members of the bands Big Contest and Intent.

History
Fiddlehead released their first EP in 2014, titled Out of the Bloom. In 2018, Fiddlehead signed to the Boston record label Run for Cover Records and released their debut full-length album titled Springtime and Blind. In 2021, they released their second full-length on Run for Cover, “Between the Richness.” 

The band rarely tours often due to Patrick Flynn being a full-time high school history teacher. The band tends to play one-off shows or small weekend tours.

Band members
Patrick Flynn - vocals (2014-present)
Alex Henery - guitar (2014-present)
Nick Hinsch - bass (2021-present)
Alex Dow - guitar (2014-present) 
Shawn Costa - drums (2014-present)

Past members

Adam Gonsalves - bass (2014-2016)

Casey Nealon - bass (2016-2021)

Discography
Studio albums
 Springtime and Blind (2018, Run for Cover Records)
 Between the Richness (2021, Run for Cover Records)

EPs
 Out of the Bloom (2014, Lockin' Out)
 Get My Mind Right (2019, Run for Cover Records)

References

American post-hardcore musical groups
Run for Cover Records artists